In the clothing industry, fast fashion is the business model of replicating recent catwalk trends and high-fashion designs, mass-producing them at a low cost, and bringing them to retail stores quickly, while demand is at its highest. The term fast fashion is also used generically to describe the products of the fast fashion business model.

Fast fashion grew during the late 20th century as manufacturing of clothing became less expensive — the result of more efficient supply chains and new quick response manufacturing methods and greater reliance on low-cost labor from the apparel manufacturing industries of South, Southeast, and East Asia, where women make up 85-90% of the garment workforce. Labor practices of fast fashion are often exploitative, and due to the gender concentration of the garment industry, women are more vulnerable.  Retailers who employ the fast fashion strategy include Primark, H&M, Shein, and Zara, all of which have become large multinationals by driving high turnover of inexpensive seasonal and trendy clothing that appeals to fashion-conscious consumers. 

The global fashion industry is responsible for ~8–10% of global carbon emissions per year, to which fast fashion is a large contributor. The low cost of production favoring synthetic materials, chemicals, and minimal pollution abatement measures have led to excess waste.

Origins 
Before the 1800s, fashion was a laborious, time-consuming process that required sourcing materials like wool, cotton, or leather, treating and preparing the materials by hand, then weaving or fashioning them into functional garments, also by hand. However, the Industrial Revolution forever changed the world of fashion by introducing new technology like the sewing machine and textile machines, which led to ready-made clothes and mass production factories. 

As a result, clothes became cheaper to make and buy, and easier and quicker to make. Meanwhile, localized dressmaking businesses emerged, catering to the middle classes, and employing workroom employees along with garment workers, who worked from home for meager wages. These dress shops were early prototypes of the so-called ‘sweatshops’ that would become the foundation for twenty-first century clothing production. During World War II, the trend of more functional styles and fabric restrictions led to the standardized production of clothes. Once middle-class consumers grew accustomed to it, they became increasingly receptive to the idea of mass-produced clothing.

The fashion industry produced and ran clothes for four seasons a year until the mid-twentieth century, with designers working many months in advance to predict what the customers would want. In the 1960s and 1970s, this method changed drastically as the younger generations started to create new trends. There was still a clear distinction between high-end and high street fashion. In the late 1990s and early 2000s, fast fashion became a booming industry in America with people enthusiastically partaking in consumerism. Fast fashion retailers such as Zara, H&M, Topshop, and Primark took over high street fashion. Initially starting as small stores located in Europe, they were able to infiltrate and gain prominence in the American market by examining and replicating the looks and design elements from runway shows and top fashion houses and quickly reproducing them, but at a fraction of the cost.

When it comes to the question of who was the pioneer of the "fast fashion" phenomenon, it is difficult to pinpoint one particular brand or company. Nevertheless, there is some evidence that suggests the popular fashion brands that helped start the phenomenon. Amancio Ortega, founder of Zara, founded his clothing company in 1963 in Galicia and it featured products that were affordable replications of popular higher-end clothing fashions in addition to producing its own unique designs. Later on, in 1975, Ortega opened the first retail outlet in Europe in order to sell his collections in the short run and also to integrate production and distribution in the long run. He eventually was able to move to New York in the early 1990s where the New York Times first coined the term “fast fashion” to describe the mission of his store, which said that “it would only take 15 days for a garment to go from a designer's brain to being sold on the racks”. 

In the 2008 article “Fast Fashion Lessons” Donald Sull and Stefano Turconi studied how Zara pioneered an approach to navigate the volatile world of the fast fashion industry. According to Sull and Turconi, one of the reasons for Zara's success was that it built a supply chain and production network where they maintained complicated and capital-intensive operations (like computer-guided fabric cutting) in-house, while it outsourced labour-intensive operations (like garment sewing) to a network of local subcontractors and seamstress operatives based in Galicia, Spain.

Thus, with shorter lead times the company was able to respond very quickly when the sale of their products exceeded their expectations and also cut off production for items that didn't have very high demands. They create a sense of urgency for consumers to purchase clothing because they are constantly changing their layout and stock, so it may not be in store the next time they visit. The clothing is then only worn a few times before it is no longer in style. This creates the need to constantly be buying new items at a cheap cost. Unlike many fashion companies, Zara hardly invests in television or press promotional campaigns and instead relies on store windows to convey the brand image, the spread of word-of-mouth and locating their shops strategically in areas with high consumer traffic.

The origin story of H&M shares common threads with Zara; technically it is the world's longest-running retailer. In 1946, Erling Persson, a Swedish entrepreneur, traveled to New York City, USA, where he was greatly intrigued and impressed by the high-volume fashion production he witnessed. The following year, Persson established a women's wear store called Hennes & Mauritz (or H&M) in Västerås, Sweden. Between 1960 and 1979, the company rapidly expanded, with 42 stores across Europe, and began producing clothing not just for women, but men and children as well. 

The foundation for expansion into the global market was laid in the 1980s when H&M acquired Rowells, a Swedish mail order company, and used its networks to sell fast fashion by catalogue and mail order. In the 1990s, H&M invested in large city billboard advertising, featuring famous celebrities and supermodels. H&M opened its flagship USA store on Fifth Avenue in New York City in 2000, marking the commencement of its expansion outside of Europe. 

Zaw Thiha Tun, a Vancouver, CA-based investment advisor, examined the secret of H&M's success as a company and notes that the business model of H&M is unlike other fast fashion companies, such as Zara, as H&M does not manufacture any products in-house. Rather, they outsource production to more than 900 independent suppliers mainly located in Europe and Asia, which are in turn managed by 30 strategically-located oversight offices. They also depend on state-of-the-art IT infrastructure and networks to connect the central national office and the production offices. This method has been crucial to H&M's success: they don't have the overhead from owning factories, or need to secure  fabrics in advance, and they have been able to reduce their lead times through continuous developments in the buying process.

Concept

Fast fashion brands produce pieces to get the newest style on the market as soon as possible. They emphasize optimizing certain aspects of the supply chain for the trends to be designed and manufactured quickly and inexpensively and allow the mainstream consumer to buy current clothing styles at a lower price. This philosophy of quick manufacturing at an affordable price is used in large retailers such as SHEIN, H&M, Zara, C&A, Peacocks, Primark, ASOS, Forever 21, and Uniqlo. 

These retailers produce and sell products in small batches, keep surplus manufacturing capacity on hand, and frequently induce items to be out of stock. This is designed to give retailers the ability to make substantial and immediate adjustments to manufacturing. For example, up to 85% of Zara's merchandise can be changed in the middle of the season. This is because a fast fashion system like Zara's can quickly update designs, resulting in short product cycles where a garment does not sit on the stores shelf for long periods of time, giving the store a sense of exclusivity and raising the attractiveness of an item.

It particularly came to the fore during the vogue for "boho chic" in the mid-2000s. According to the UK Environmental Audit Committee's report "Fixing Fashion," fast fashion "involves increased numbers of new fashion collections every year, quick turnarounds and often lower prices. Reacting rapidly to offer new products to meet consumer demand is crucial to this business model.”

Fast fashion has developed from a product-driven concept based on a manufacturing model referred to as "quick response" developed in the U.S. in the 1980s and moved to a market-based model of "fast fashion" in the late 1990s and first part of the 21st century. The Zara brand name has become almost synonymous with the term, but other retailers worked with the concept before the label was applied, such as Benetton. Fast fashion has also become associated with disposable fashion because it has delivered designer product to a mass market at relatively low prices.

The advancement of technology has allowed fast fashion to gain popularity over the last decade. Technology has allowed designers to create specifically what their consumers want according to what is "in" at the given moment. Every month there are new things trending and new things being displayed in stores to market towards the youth. Technology has the power to change all the issues within the fast fashion industry. Brands such as Zara have been listening to its consumers and thinking green to improve their environmental impact. As Nina Davis states, "[Companies] are also adopting advanced technologies to improve supply chain efficiency and reduce their carbon footprint."

Slow fashion counter 

The slow fashion or conscious fashion movement has risen in opposition to fast fashion, naming responsibility for pollution (both in the production of clothes and in the decay of synthetic fabrics), poor workmanship, and emphasizing very brief trends over classic style. Elizabeth L. Cline's 2012 book Overdressed: The Shockingly High Cost of Cheap Fashion was one of the first investigations into the human and environmental toll of fast fashion. Fast fashion has also come under criticism for contributing to poor working conditions in developing countries. The 2013 Dhaka garment factory collapse in Bangladesh, the deadliest garment-related accident in world history,  brought more attention to the safety impact of the fast fashion industry.

In the rise of slow fashion, emphasis has been given to quality, considerate clothing. In recent Spring/Summer Fashion Show 2020, high end designers are leading the movement of slow fashion by creating pieces that develop environmental friendly practices in the industry. Stella McCartney is one luxury designer who focuses on sustainable and ethical practices, and has done so since the nineties. British Vogue explains that the process of designing and creating clothing in slow fashion involves consciousness of materials, consumers demand, and the climate impact.

In her 2016 article titled “Doing Good and Looking Good: Women in ‘Fast Fashion’ Activism”, Rimi Khan criticizes the slow fashion movement, particularly the work of high-profile designers and slow fashion advocates Stella McCartney and Vivienne Westwood, as well as other well known industry professionals such as Livia Firth, for creating slow fashion products which cater to a mostly western, wealthy, and female demographic. Khan points out that because most slow fashion products are significantly more expensive than fast fashion items, consumers are required to have a certain amount of disposable income in order to participate in the movement. 

Khan argues that by proposing a solution to fast-fashion that is largely inaccessible to many consumers, they are positioning wealthier women as “agents of change” in the movement against fast fashion, whereas the shopping habits of lower income women and people of other genders are often considered “problematic”. Andrea Chang provides a similar critique of the slow fashion movement in her article “The Impact of Fast Fashion on Women”. Chang argues that the slow fashion and ethical fashion movements place too much responsibility on the consumers of fast fashion clothing, most of whom are women, to influence the industry through their consumption. 

Chang suggests that because most consumers are limited in their ability to choose where and how they purchase clothing, largely due to financial factors, anti-fast fashion activists should target lawmakers, manufacturers, and investors with a stake in the fast fashion industry rather than create an alternative industry that is only accessible to some.

Economics 
Fast fashion has an ongoing trend of being successful economically within the retail industry worldwide. The fast-fashion market in 2020 globally produced $25.1 billion. It was expected to increase at an annual compound growth rate (CAGR) of 21.9%, resulting in the global market increase to $31 billion in 2021. By 2030, the fast fashion industry will bring a revenue of $192 billion to the world's global economy. 

This economic growth from fast fashion is demonstrated through how the fast fashion industries like H&M or Shein strategize in manufacturing. Most fast fashion clothes exporters are from developing countries across Asia, such as India, Bangladesh, Vietnam, China, Indonesia, Cambodia, etc. Developing countries' economy relies on fast fashion consumption as most of their export earnings profit from ready-made clothes. China, for example, has gained a yearly profit of $158.4 billion from exporting ready-made clothes. Additionally, the hazardous working circumstances that these employees endure have an adverse effect on their health, increasing the risk of illness and accidents among their coworkers and having a negative effect on the labor force around the world.

Manufacturing 
The economic decision for the fast fashion industry to thrive is by producing high revenue through low production costs within their manufacturers in Asia. One low production cost in the fast fashion retail is the investment cost of materials to make a garment. Fast fashion invests in polyester and cotton fabric because they are inexpensive and durable materials. In 2020, polyester's global price per metric ton was $725 (or 32.9 cents per pound), and the global price for cotton in 2021 was 126 cents per pound. 

According to these statistics, polyester fabric is more affordable than cotton, but both are relativity cheaper than higher quality fabric such as silk or wool. One basic T-shirt would require .5 Ibs of cotton material, resulting in less than $1 of cotton fabric used. Inexpensive materials allow the fast fashion industry to produce a high volume of affordable clothes at a low production cost. Therefore, retailers profit from selling high volumes of affordable designer clothes by its increased markup price from the  material cost.

Wage criticisms 
The fast fashion industry faces criticism for hiring garments workers from developing countries for their low wages. There are more than 60 million workers that produce garments for the fast fashion retail, and 80% of those workers are women. MVO Netherlands researched in 2019 that workers' monthly wages in Ethiopia that manufacture for H&M, Gap, and JCPenney begins at $32, while an experienced worker is $122 a month. In other words, the lowest hourly wage for workers in developing countries is less than .50 cents. In developed countries like the United States, the average garment worker in Los Angeles, reported by the Garment Worker Center (GWC), is about $5.15 per hour despite the federal minimum wage being $7.25 per hour in 2016. 

Hence, their monthly income would be about $858 (if they worked 40 hours a week), which is a much higher salary than in developing countries but still lower than the United States standard of living in income conditions. To reach the target goal of consumer demands from the U.S. and Europe, garment laborers in developing countries, on average, are expected to work 11 hours a day. Thus fast fashion retailers face economic criticism for paying garment laborers from developing and developed countries unlivable wages while imposing long work hours to meet consumer demands.

Strategy

Management 
Fashion is updated frequently to meet peoples demand of aestheticism wearing the newest and latest clothing style and it is done in a mannerly fast process. This efficiency is achieved through the retailers’ understanding of the target market's wants, which is a high fashion-looking garment at a price at the lower end of the clothing sector. One of the largest causes of the high demand for fashion is the short trend cycles. The more an audience is exposed to new trends, the higher the demand grows. Primarily, the concept of category management has been used to align the retail buyer and the manufacturer in a more collaborative relationship.

Quick response method
Quick Response (QR) was developed to improve manufacturing processes in the textile industry with the aim of removing time from the production system. The U.S. Apparel Manufacturing Association initiated the project in the early 1980s to address a competitive threat to its own textile manufactures from imported textiles in low labor cost countries. During the project lead times in the manufacturing process were halved; the U.S. industry became more competitive for a time, and imports were lowered as a result.
The QR initiative was viewed by many as a protection mechanism for the American textile industry with the aim of improving manufacturing efficiencies.

The concept of quick response (QR) is now used to support "fast fashion," creating new, fresh products while also drawing consumers back to the retail experience for consecutive visits.  Quick response also makes it possible for new technologies to increase production and efficiency, typified by the introduction of the complementary concept of Fast Fit.  The Spanish mega chain Zara, owned by Inditex, has become the global model for how to decrease the time between design and production. This production short cut enables Zara to manufacture over 30,000 units of product every year to nearly 1,600 stores in 58 countries.  

New items are delivered twice a week to the stores, reducing the time between initial sale and replenishment. As a result, the shortened time period improves consumer's garment choices and product availability while significantly increasing the number of per customer visits per annum. In the case of Renner, a Brazilian chain, a new mini-collection is released every two months.

Delivery 

Fast Fashion typically offers buyers quick shipping, meaning their delivery can be same day or only take a few days.Due to the trends constantly evolving, buyers need to have their item before it is no longer in style. Oftentimes, these Fast Fashion brands will offer the buyer deals, where they can spend a certain amount of money to get free shipping.This creates a lot of impulse buying, resulting in the items being returned. However, Fast Fashion returns do not always get sold again. It is likely that the company will throw the item out because it is no longer in style.

Marketing
Marketing is the key driver of fast fashion. Marketing creates the desire for consumption of new designs as close as possible to the point of creation. Marketing closes the gap between creation and consumption by promoting this as something fast, low priced, and disposable. The continuous release of new products essentially makes the garments a highly cost effective marketing tool that drives consumer visits, increases brand awareness, and results in higher rates of consumer purchases. Fast fashion companies have also enjoyed higher profit margins in that their markdown percentage is only 15% compared to competitors’ 30% plus. The fast fashion business model is based on reducing the time cycles from production to consumption such that consumers engage in more cycles in any time period. Not only is fast fashion based on reducing cycles but it is also based on trends that change throughout the seasons to stimulate sales. For example, the traditional fashion seasons followed the annual cycle of summer, autumn, winter and spring, but in fast fashion cycles have compressed into shorter periods of 4–6 weeks and in some cases less than this. Marketers have thus created more buying seasons in the same time-space.

Two approaches are currently being used by companies as market strategies; the difference is the amount of financial capital spent on advertisements. While some companies invest in advertising, fast fashion mega firm Primark operates with no advertising. Primark instead invests in store layout, shop-fit and visual merchandising to create an instant hook.  The instant hook creates an enjoyable shopping experience, resulting in the continuous return of customers. Research shows that 75 percent of consumers' decisions are made in front of the fixture within three seconds.  The alternative spending of Primark also "allows the retailer to pass the benefits of a cost saving back to the consumer and maintain the company's price structure of producing garments at a lower cost".

Social media marketing 
In recent years, fast fashion retailers have taken on a new approach to reach their consumers. Initially, social media's sole purpose was to act as a platform that allowed people to connect with other users around the world. However, people started to realize that there is more to social media than just sharing pictures with your family and friends. Social media has become a way for retailers to promote their products and impact consumer behavior. Now, consumers are able to look at products and businesses on social media before heading to a store or going online to make a purchase. Additionally, consumers can read real customer reviews on different social media accounts in order to get a better idea of the quality of the products as well as how the customer service is. Once people started to pick up on the marketing potential that social media has, fast fashion retailers were quick to jump on the trend. Fast fashion retailers like Boohoo.com realized that social media advertisements could be a great way to reach their target audience, young girls. These users were swarmed with fast fashion advertisements each time they opened up Instagram. Companies like Boohoo hoped that the constant exposure to their products would influence users to not only visit their website, but also to buy clothing from them.

Instead of just posting pre-made ads on their accounts, fast fashion retailers realized that an effective way to advertise their clothing could be to join forces with social media influencers. Social media influencers can be defined as "regular" individuals who have accrued a large number of followers across multiple social media platforms as a result of the content they post. For the most part, social media influencers focus their content on one subject area, like food or fashion. Social media influencers have become their own kind of "internet celebrities" and their followers value and trust their opinions. As a result, when social media influencers post content wearing an outfit from Shein, their followers may feel compelled to purchase clothing from that retailer as well. Studies have shown that there is a correlation between following social media influencers and shopping more frequently. Even though some fast fashion retailers still have "celebrity ambassadors", many retailers have turned to social media influencers to promote their clothing.

The world saw a surge in these social media marketing practices after the coronavirus pandemic hit. Fast fashion retailer Shein quickly took center stage across numerous social media platforms. Social media users, specifically young women, could not go online without seeing something from this fast fashion website. "Shein hauls" became one of the most popular trends on TikTok, with 4.7 billion #sheinhaul views as of March 2022.  Haul videos consist of individuals recording themselves showing items they purchased (typically a large quantity) and posting the video on platforms like YouTube or TikTok. In the midst of a global pandemic, these billions of views allowed Shein to bring in about $10 billion in revenue in 2020.

Production

"Supermarket" market
The consumer in the fast fashion market thrives on constant change and the frequent availability of new products.  Fast fashion is considered to be a "supermarket" segment within the larger sense of the fashion market.  This term refers to fast fashion's nature to "race to make apparel an even smarter and quicker cash generator".  Three crucial differentiating model factors exist within fast fashion consumption: market timing, cost, and the buying cycle.  Timing's objective is to create the shortest production time possible. The quick turnover has increased the demand for the number of seasons presented in the stores. This demand also increases shipping and restocking time periods. Cost is still the consumer's primary buying decision. Costs are largely reduced by taking advantage of lower prices in markets in developing countries. In 2004 developing countries accounted for nearly seventy five percent of all clothing exports and the removal of several import quotas has allowed companies to take advantage of the even lower cost of resources. The buying cycle is the final factor that affects the consumer. Traditionally, fashion buying cycles are based around long term forecasts that occur one year to six months before the season.

Supply chain, vendor relationships and internal relationships

Supply chain
Supply chains are central to the creation of fast fashion. Supply chain systems are designed to add value and reduce cost in the process of moving goods from design concept to retail stores and finally through to consumption. Efficient supply chains are critical to delivering the retail customer promise of fast fashion. The selection of a merchandising vendor is a key part in the process. Inefficiency primarily occurs when suppliers can't respond quickly enough, and clothing ends up bottlenecked and in back stock.  Two kinds of supply chains exist, agile and lean. In an agile supply chain the principal characteristics include the sharing of information and technology.  The collaboration results in the reduction in the amount of stock in megastores. A lean supply chain is characterized as the correct appropriation of the commodity for the product.

Vendor relationships
The companies in the fast fashion market also utilize a range of relationships with the suppliers. The product is first classified as "core" or "fashion".

Internal relationships
Productive internal relationships within the fast fashion companies are as important as the company's relationships with external suppliers, especially when it comes to the company's buyers. Traditionally with a "supermarket" market the buying is divided into multi-functional departments. The buying team uses the bottom-up approach when trend information is involved, meaning the information is only shared with the company's fifteen top suppliers.  On the other hand, information about future aims, and strategies of production are shared downward within the buyer hierarchy so the team can consider lower cost production options.

Environmental impact

According to the United Nations Economic Commission for Europe, the fast fashion system provides opportunities for economic growth but the entire fashion industry hinders sustainability efforts by contributing to 20% of wastewater. In addition, fast fashion is responsible for nearly 10 percent of global gas emissions. Providing insight, the Ellen Macarthur Foundation released study results on fashion and suggests a new circular system. A singular t-shirt requires over 2,000 liters of water to make. Clothing is not utilized to its full potential, the Ellen MacArthur Foundation explains that linear systems are contributing to unsustainable behavior and the future of fashion may need to transition towards a circular system of production and consumer behavior.

Journalist Elizabeth L. Cline, author of Overdressed: The Shockingly High Cost of Cheap Fashion and one of the earliest critics of fast fashion, notes in her article Where Does Discarded Clothing Go? that Americans are purchasing five times the amount of clothing than they did in 1980. Due to this rise in consumption, developed countries are producing more and more garments each season. The United States imports more than 1 billion garments annually from China alone. United Kingdom textile consumption surged by 37% from 2001 to 2005.
The Global Fashion Business Journal reported that in 2018, the global fiber production has reached the highest all-time, 107 million metric tons.

The average American household produces  of textile waste every year. The residents of New York City discard around 193,000 tons of clothing and textiles, which equates to 6% of all the city's garbage. In comparison, the European Union generates a total of 5.8 million tons of textiles each year. As a whole, the textile industry occupies roughly 5% of all landfill space. This means that the clothing industry produces about 92 million tons of textile waste annually, much of which is burned or goes into a landfill and less than 1% of used clothing is recycled into new garments. The clothing that is discarded into landfills is often made from non-biodegradable synthetic materials.

Greenhouse gases and various pesticides and dyes are released into the environment by fashion-related operations. The United Nations estimated that the business of what we wear, including its long supply chains, is responsible for 10 percent of the greenhouse gas emissions heating our planet. The growing demand for quick fashion continuously adds effluent release from the textile factories, containing both dyes and caustic solutions.  In comparison, greenhouse gas emissions from textile production companies is more than international flights and maritime shipping combined annually. The materials used not only affect the environment in textile product, but also the workers and the people who wear the clothes. The hazardous substances affect all aspects of life and release into the environments around them. Optoro estimates that 5 billion pounds of waste is generated through returns each year, contributing 15 million metric tons of carbon dioxide to the atmosphere. Fast fashion production has doubled since 2000, with brands such as Zara producing 24 collections a year and H&M producing about 12 to 16 collections a year.

Sustainability

Recycling 
Due to the amount of pollution and waste caused by the fashion industry, for-profit groups, like Viletex, and retailers, such as H&M, are working to decrease the industry's environmental footprint and adopt sustainable technologies. Both companies have created programs that encourage recycling from the general public. These programs provide consumers with bins that allow them to dispose of their unwanted garments that will ultimately be transformed into insulation and carpet padding, as well as being used to produce other garments.

Advances in technologies have offered new methods of using dyes, producing fibers, and reducing the use of natural resources. To decrease the consumption of traditional textiles, Anke Domaske has produced "QMilch," an eco-milk fiber; Virus has produced high-tech sportswear from recycled coffee beans; and Suzanne Lee has created vegetable leather from fermented tea. Many companies have also created various ways to reduce the amount of dyes emitted into the world's waterways as well as the level of water consumption. For example, AirDye saves between 7 and 75 gallons of water per pound of textiles produced while digital printing reduces water usage by 95 percent.

Other retailers, like Patagonia, encourage their customers to mend their clothes as they wear over time instead of disposing of the garments when they become worn out.

Design strategies & techniques 
According to FutureLearn, the following design strategies and techniques can be applied to make fast fashion more sustainable:

 Zero Waste Pattern Cutting: This technique eliminates potential textile waste right at the design stage, where the pattern pieces are strategically laid like a jigsaw puzzle onto a precisely measured piece of fabric.
 Minimal Seam Construction: This technique allows faster manufacturing time by lessening the number of seams that are necessary to stitch a garment.
 Design for Disassembly (DfD): The main intention of this strategy involves designing a product in such a way that it can be easily taken apart at the end of its lifespan and this allows the use of fewer materials.
 Craft preservation: This technique combines and incorporates ancestral craft techniques into modern designs and in a way it ensures preservation of traditional craftsmanship through innovation.
 Transformational/Multifunctional: This strategy can be used to design products or garments that could be worn in numerous ways and can even have elements that are reversible. The best real-life example is the Carry on Closet fashion line created and developed by Antithesis.
 Pull Factor Framework: Brands such as L.L Bean and Harvey Nichols implemented a “Pull Factor Framework” which is a new methodology that strives to make sustainable innovation more enticing for consumers and producers alike.

Technology
Fast fashion brands like ASOS.com, Levi's, Macy's, North Face have turned to sizing technology that use algorithms to solve sizing issues, and give accurate size recommendations on their website to reduce environmental impact on returns. H&M's design team is implementing 3D design, 3D sampling and 3D prototyping to help cut waste, while artificial intelligence can be used to produce small garment runs for specific stores.

Companies are helping support the circular system in fashion production and consumer behavior by renting out clothes to customers with recycled or reuse items. New York & Company Closet and American Eagle Style Drop are examples of rental services that can be offered to customers when subscribed to the program. Tulerie, a smartphone application offers borrowing, renting, or sharing of clothes in local communities across the globe; users have the opportunity to profit by renting clothes as well.

Overconsumption 
In contrast to modern overconsumption, fast fashion traces its roots to World War II austerity, where high design was merged with utilitarian materials. The business model of fast fashion is based on consumers’ desire for new clothing to wear. In order to fulfill consumers' demand, fast fashion brands provide affordable prices and a wide range of clothing that reflects the latest trends. This ends up persuading consumers to buy more items which leads to the issue of overconsumption. Dana Thomas, author of Fashionopolis, stated that Americans spent 340 billion dollars on clothing in 2012, the same year of the Rana Plaza collapse.

Planned obsolescence plays a key role in overconsumption. Based on the study of planned obsolescence in The Economist, fashion is deeply committed to planned obsolescence. Last year's skirts; for example, are designed to be replaced by this year's new models. In this case, fashion goods are purchased even when the old ones are still wearable. The quick response model and new supply chain practices of fast fashion even accelerate the speed of it. In recent years, the fashion cycle has steadily decreased as fast fashion retailers sell clothing that is expected to be disposed of after being worn only a few times.

A 2014 article about fast fashion in Huffington Post pointed out that in order to make the fast moving trend affordable, fast-fashion merchandise is typically priced much lower than the competition, operating on a business model of low quality and high volume. Low quality goods make overconsumption more severe since those products have a shorter life span and would need to be replaced much more often. Furthermore, as both industry and consumers continue to embrace fast fashion, the volume of goods to be disposed of or recycled has increased substantially. However, most fast-fashion goods do not have the inherent quality to be considered as collectables for vintage or historic collections.

Labour concerns

Sweatshops 
The fashion industry is known as the most labor dependent industry, as one in every six people works in acquiring raw materials and manufacturing clothing. There is an increasing concern for sweastshops as more fast fashion stores are lowering their prices and trends are fluctuating more frequently. Brands and store companies that use sweatshops are GAP, H&M, Zara, Abercrombie and Fitch and plenty of others.

In particular H&M faced controversial issues and backlash regarding their sweatshops in Asian countries. H&M is the largest producer of clothing in under-developed South Asian and Southeast Asian countries such as India, Bangladesh and Cambodia. 500 employees in Indonesia left their work and protested for higher pay that was below the minimum wage for their country. Once a strike evolved, the factory removed their access to the building and paid men to harass the workers.

Nike has received backlash over its use of sweatshops. Bangladesh – a country known for its cheap labor, is home to four million garment production workers in over 5000 factories, out of which 85% are women. Many of these factories do not have proper working conditions for essential workers. In 2013 a group of garment workers protested in Bangladesh for the poor quality of the building. A horrific tragedy took place in Rana Plaza factory, the building collapsed and killed over 1,000 workers. Not only did these workers have a badly manufactured building, were overworked,Bangladesh is considered to have the lowest minimum wage from all the countries that export apparel.

Women and export processing zones 

The International Labour Organization defines export processing zones as “industrial zones with special incentives set up to attract foreign investors, in which imported materials undergo some degree of processing before being re-exported”. These zones have been used by developing countries to bolster foreign investment, and produce consumer goods that are labour-intensive, like clothing. Many export processing zones have been criticized for their substandard working conditions, low wages, and suspension of international and domestic labour laws. Women account for 70-90% of the working population in some export processing zones, such as in Sri Lanka, Bangladesh, and the Philippines. Despite their overrepresentation in export processing zone informal sector (informal economy) employment, women are still likely to earn less than men. Mainly, this discrepancy is due to employer's preferring to hire men in technical and managerial positions and women in lower-skilled production work. Moreover, employers tend to prefer hiring women for production jobs because they are seen as more compliant and less likely to join labour unions. In addition, a report that interviewed Sri Lankan women working in export processing zones found that gender-based violence “emerged as a dominant theme in their narratives”. For example, 38% of women reported seeing or experiencing sexual harassment within their workplace. However, proponents of textile and garment production as a means for economic upgrading in developing countries (global value chain) have pointed out that clothing production work tends to have higher wages than other available jobs, such as agriculture or domestic service work, and therefore provides women with a larger degree of financial autonomy.

Film and media 
The True Cost is a 2015 documentary film focusing on fast fashion that is directed by Andrew Morgan.
'How fast fashion adds to the world's clothing waste problem''' is a short 2018 documentary created by Marketplace that is a part of the CBC News'' network.

Design lawsuits and legislation

Lawsuits and proposed legislation in the U.S.
As of 2007, Forever 21, one of the larger fast fashion retailers, was involved in several lawsuits over alleged violations of intellectual property rights.  The lawsuits contended that certain pieces of merchandise at the retailer can effectively be considered infringements of designs from Diane von Furstenberg, Anna Sui and Gwen Stefani's Harajuku Lovers line as well as many other well-known designers. Forever 21 has not commented on the state of the litigation but initially said it was "taking steps to organize itself to prevent intellectual property violations".

H.R. 5055
H.R. 5055, or Design Piracy Prohibition Act, was a bill proposed to protect the copyright of fashion designers in the United States.  The bill was introduced into the United States House of Representatives on March 30, 2006. Under the bill designers would submit fashion sketches and/or photos to the U.S. Copyright Office within three months of the products’ "publication". This publication includes everything from magazine advertisements to the garment's first public runway appearances.  The bill as a result, would protect the designs for three years after the initial publication. If infringement of copyright was to occur the infringer would be fined $250,000, or $5 per copy, whichever is a larger lump sum.

H.R. 2033
The Design Piracy Prohibition Act was reintroduced as H.R. 2033 during the first session of the 110th Congress on April 25, 2007. It had goals similar to H.R. 5055, as the bill proposed to protect certain types of apparel design through copyright protection of fashion design. The bill would grant fashion designs a three-year term of protection, based on registration with the U.S. Copyright Office. The fines of copyright infringement would continue to be $250,000 total or $5 per copied merchandise.

See also
Cost per wear
Slow fashion
Digital fashion
Micro-trends in Fashion

References

Further reading
 

Fashion
History of fashion
Fashion industry
Clothing industry
Consumerism